Domina is a gladiator simulation video game developed by Bignic and released into early access through Steam on April 3, 2017. In the game, the player takes on the role of a woman who must manage her father's ludus and train gladiators in order to restore its reputation.

On September 2, 2022, the game was removed from Steam due to transphobic comments made by the developer within the update notes of the game. Since September 5, the game has been available for purchase on Gumroad.

Gameplay 
Domina feature both real-time combat and gladiator management, where the player can train and purchase new armor and weaponry. During fights, the player can control a single gladiator in order to combat hostile, AI-controlled opponents.

Reception 
Eurogamer Italia's Davide Pessach gave the game 8 out of 10, stating that "the experience is really fun". Nate Crowley of Rock Paper Shotgun called the game "ultra-brutal" and mentioned "wild balance issues", but concluded by praising the soundtrack, calling it "fucking spectacular". PC Gamer's Christopher Livingstone also praised the game, calling it "a lot of fun" but criticized the AI of allied gladiators.

Controversy 
On March 12, 2022, developer Bignic added an anti-mask message to Domina patch notes, writing "Women don't like dudes who cover their faces in fear. What are you afraid of? Getting laid? Grow up." The game was subsequently review bombed by Steam users.

In early September 2022, all of Bignic's games were removed for sale from Steam due to the presence of transphobic comments within Dominas patch notes, including insults aimed at transgender Canadian streamer Keffals.

References 

2017 video games
Simulation video games
Video games about gladiatorial combat
Video games developed in Canada